Honorio Rúa Betancur (born 19 December 1934) is a Colombian former cyclist. He competed in the team pursuit event at the 1956 Summer Olympics.

Major results
1955
 2nd Overall Vuelta a Colombia
1st Stage 9
1958
 2nd Overall Vuelta a Guatemala
1st Stage 5
 3rd Overall Vuelta a Colombia
1st Stage 4
1959
 Central American and Caribbean Games
2nd  Individual pursuit
2nd  Team pursuit
 3rd Overall Vuelta a Colombia
1st Stage 7

References

External links

1934 births
Living people
Colombian male cyclists
Olympic cyclists of Colombia
Cyclists at the 1956 Summer Olympics
Sportspeople from Medellín